Takawira is a Zimbabwean surname that may refer to
Bernard Takawira (1948–1997), Zimbabwean sculptor, brother of John
Gerald Takawira (1964–2004), Zimbabwean sculptor, son of John
John Takawira (1938–1989), Zimbabwean sculptor, father of John
Leopold Takawira (1916–1970), Vice-President of the Zimbabwe African National Union
Vitalis Takawira (born 1972), Zimbabwean football player

See also
Takawira Rural District Council in Zimbabwe